God is the third studio album by then 18-year-old Christian pop and rock artist Rebecca St. James. It was released on 25 June 1996 by ForeFront Records, and peaked at No. 200 on the Billboard 200. The title song was featured on WOW #1s: 31 of the Greatest Christian Music Hits Ever. It was RIAA Certified Gold in 2005. This was the first of many Rebecca St. James albums produced by Tedd Tjornhom.

Commercial performance

The song "God" was a hit in 1996, topping three Christian Rock Charts. The radio singles "You're the Voice", "Abba (Father)" and "Go & Sin No More" also did well, while the single "Me Without You" failed to gain major airplay. Though never released as singles "Psalm 139", "Speak to Me" and "You Then Me" have all become fan favorites.

Track listing

Personnel 
 Rebecca St. James – lead and backing vocals, arrangements
 Tedd T – arrangements, acoustic piano, Fender Rhodes, harmonica, programming, bass, percussion 
 Carl Marsh – accordion, Mellotron, string arrangements
 David Cleveland – acoustic guitars  
 Vince Emmett – electric guitar, steel guitar
 Brent Milligan – electric guitar, bass, percussion 
 Otto Price – electric guitar, bass
 Chuck Zwicky – additional guitars (2)
 Dan Needham – drums, percussion
 Hunter Lee – Uilleann pipes, Irish flute, didjeridu
 Josh Smallbone – guest MC (8)
 Tina Keil – additional backing vocals (10)
 Paul Q-Pek – additional backing vocals (10)
 Lori Wilshire – additional backing vocals (10)
 Micah Wilshire – additional backing vocals (10)

Production 
 Tedd T – producer, recording 
 Dan R. Brock – executive producer 
 Eddie DeGarmo – executive producer 
 Julian Kindred – recording, mix assistant (2-10)
 Tom Laune – recording 
 Paul Salvo – recording 
 Peter Briggs – recording assistant 
 Greg Parker – recording assistant
 Shane D. Wilson – recording assistant
 John Hampton – mixing (1)
 Skidd Mills – mixing (1)
 Chuck Zwicky – mixing (2-10)
 Chuck Linder – mix assistant (2-10)
 Daryl Smith – mix assistant (2-10)
 Ken Love – mastering 
 Tom Davis – art direction, design 
 Jeff Frazier – photography 
 Geenie Freeman – make-up
 David Smallbone – management 

Studios
 Recorded at 9070 Studios (Brentwood, Tennessee).
 Track 1 mixed at Ardent Studios (Memphis, Tennessee).
 Tracks 2-10 mixed at 9070 Studios; Recording Arts Studio (Nashville, Tennessee); Gambit Studio (Gallatin, Tennessee); Secret Sound (Franklin, Tennessee).
 Mastered at MasterMix (Nashville, Tennessee).

Charts
Album - Billboard (North America)

Singles - CCM Magazine (North America)

References

1996 albums
ForeFront Records albums
Rebecca St. James albums